Lance Naik Ram Ugrah Pandey, MVC was a war hero of Indo-Pakistani war of 1971. He was posthumously honored with India's second highest war time gallantry awardMaha Vir Chakra.

Early life

Lance Naik Ram Ugrah Pandey was born in the village Aima-Bansi in Ghazipur district of Uttar Pradesh.
His father’s name was H.N. Pandey. He got his education at his native place. After passing matriculation he got enrolled in 8 Guard of 202 Mountain Brigade of Indian Army in 1962.

Death

During the India-Pakistan war 1971 in the battle of Morpara led assault on enemy’s fortified position supporting the advancing companies of Indian army. To keep the enemy at bay he captured an RCL and destroyed it. He shot three adversaries. However, in doing so a cannon shot burst very closed to him and he was killed on the spot.
He is survived by his daughter Mrs Sunita Dubey .

Military recognition

For displaying exceptional gallantry for the nation Lance Naik Ram Ugrah Pandey was decorated with Maha Vir Chakra, posthumously.

References

Indian military personnel killed in action
Recipients of the Maha Vir Chakra
People of the Indo-Pakistani War of 1971
1971 deaths
Indian military personnel of the Indo-Pakistani War of 1971
People from Ghazipur
1942 births